All Mine to Give (British title: The Day They Gave Babies Away) is a 1957 Technicolor melodrama film directed by Allen Reisner and starring Glynis Johns, Cameron Mitchell, and Rex Thompson. When first one parent, then the other, dies, their six children have to look after themselves in the Wisconsin of the mid-19th century.

Plot
Robert and Mamie Eunson (Cameron Mitchell and Glynis Johns) are Scottish immigrants who have just arrived in America in the year 1856, having been invited there by Mamie's uncle, Will Jameson. They arrive in the tiny logging village of Eureka, Wisconsin, only to be informed that Mamie's uncle died when his cabin burned to the ground. After starting out alone with the task of rebuilding, the Eunsons are assisted by the friendly locals - who show-up en masse - in reconstructing the house as Robert takes to tipping timber.

Mamie is heavily pregnant upon their arrival in Eureka. Aided by midwife, Mrs. Pugmeister, she delivers baby Robbie (Rex Thompson), soon after the cabin is completed. Robert first works for a logging camp as a lumberjack. He eventually wins over Tom Cullen (Alan Hale) after winning an impromptu fist fight with the cruel Irish-American lumber-camp boss. Later Robert starts a successful boat-building business and Mamie gives birth to five more children: Jimmy (Stephen Wootton), Kirk (Butch Bernard), Annabelle (Patty McCormack), Elizabeth (Yolanda White), and Jane (Terry Ann Ross).

The Eunsons are prospering and happy until little Kirk is diagnosed with diphtheria. Mamie and Kirk are quarantined while Robert takes the other children away. The boy recovers, but the goodbye kiss Kirk gave his Dadda before his departure proves fatal, and Robert succumbs. Mamie takes to working as a seamstress and Robbie becomes the man of the house. Things stabilize, but only briefly: tired and work-worn, Mamie contracts typhoid. Knowing she will not survive, she charges Robbie, her eldest, with finding good homes for his siblings, with families that have children, so they will not be lonely.

After Mamie's death, some of the townspeople wish to decide right away where the children should go. Robbie and Jimmy ask for one more day, Christmas, together. The townspeople agree. However, Robbie has a plan. He makes a list of families that would be appropriate, and one by one, delivers his sisters to the homes he has chosen, realizing that they are unlikely to be turned down on Christmas. Jimmy takes Kirk to his new home. Stoic and resigned during the process, Robbie finally breaks down when he is alone and sees the tree outside the homestead where his father had carved the names of all of the children into the bark.

Finally, Jimmy and Robbie say an unsaid good-bye to each other and their home. Baby Jane is the last to be handed over — Robbie stands at the door of a house and asks the woman who answers "Please, ma'am, I was wondering if you'd care to have my sister." Then he bravely goes off alone to work at the logging camp.

Cast

 Glynis Johns as Mamie
 Cameron Mitchell as Robert
 Rex Thompson as Robbie
 Patty McCormack as Annabelle
 Ernest Truex as Doctor Delbert
 Hope Emerson as Mrs. Pugmeister
 Alan Hale, Jr. as Tom Cullen (billed as Alan Hale)
 Sylvia Field as Lelia Delbert
 Royal Dano as Howard Tyler
 Reta Shaw as Mrs. Runyon
 Stephen Wootton as Jimmy
 Butch Bernard as Kirk
 Yolanda White as Elizabeth
 Rita Johnson as Katie Tyler
 Ellen Corby as Mrs. Raiden
 Rosalyn Boulter as Mrs. Stephens 
 Francis De Sales as Mr. Stephens 
 Jon Provost as Robbie Eunson - age 6

Production

Screenplay
The film is based on an article "The Day They Gave Babies Away," by Dale Eunson and his wife Katherine Albert, which first appeared in the December 1946 issue of Cosmopolitan. The article is about a true-life story in Wisconsin. Dale Eunson is the son of the story's protagonist, Robert Eunson. A year later, the story was published as a book of the same title. A TV version The Day They Gave Babies Away, starring Brandon deWilde, aired on the CBS anthology show Climax! on December 22, 1955. Eunson and his wife Katherine also wrote the screenplay for All Mine to Give.

Filming
Although the film is set in Eureka, Wisconsin, exteriors were filmed in Big Bear, California, Idyllwild, California and Mount Hood, Oregon.
Eureka, Wisconsin is a city in Winnebago County, Wisconsin. It is not situated in Polk County. It sets approximately 8 miles NE of Berlin Wisconsin, of which a reference is made by Robbie in the film "All Mine To Give".

See also
 List of American films of 1957

References

External links
 
 
 
 
 

1957 films
1950s Christmas drama films
1950s Christmas films
American Christmas drama films
American films based on plays
Films about families
Films about orphans
Films based on newspaper and magazine articles
Films set in 1856
Films set in Wisconsin
Films about lumberjacks
RKO Pictures films
Universal Pictures films
Melodrama films
1957 drama films
1950s English-language films
1950s American films